Sarah Mezzanotte is an American actress.  She is known for playing Marnie in the Netflix series Chambers.  She is a co-recipient of the 2017 Obie Award for Best Ensemble for her work in Sarah DeLappe's The Wolves.  She also received a special Drama Desk Award for Outstanding Ensemble for her work in The Wolves.

Select filmography
Blue Bloods (2017)
Blame (2017)
Central Park (2017)
Drunk Bus (2020)

References

External links
 
 
 

Living people
21st-century American actresses
American film actresses
American stage actresses
American television actresses
Obie Award recipients
Drama Desk Award winners
Year of birth missing (living people)